The Bonnieure is a river in the Charente département, southwestern France, left tributary to the river Charente. Its source is in Genouillac, in the east of the department. It flows into the Charente near Mansle. Another town along the Bonnieure is Chasseneuil-sur-Bonnieure. The Tardoire is a left tributary of the Bonnieure.

References

Rivers of France
Rivers of Nouvelle-Aquitaine
Rivers of Charente